Dinosaur Park is a science fiction novel by American writer Hayford Peirce, first published by Tor in 1989 under the title The Thirteenth Majestral and republished as Dinosaur Park in 1994. The nondescript cover of the original book had no relation to the story. The 1992 Italian edition had a cover by Oscar Chichoni featuring dinosaurs, which were indeed in the story, and in June 1994 Tor reissued the book under its new title, using the same cover as the Italian edition. Jurassic Park, a 1990 novel by Michael Crichton, had recently been a bestseller and Tor may have hoped to capitalize on the similarity of the names and theme. The original book, The Thirteenth Majestral, was published before Jurassic Park.

Overview
Dinosaur Park is a complex, semi-humorous novel written in the manner of the well-known science-fiction author Jack Vance. Its theme is that of many books by Vance: retribution by the grown-up protagonist for injustices done to him and his family in his youth. Locus said of the first edition: "Some writers have tried to adapt the Vancian style in tribute or pastiche. Hayford Peirce's The Thirteenth Majestral is a very faithful effort, chock-a-block with poignant nomenclature, strange lands, and dinosaurs (cf The Dragon Masters), and featuring the requisite grim young hero out for revenge. Peirce captures the moods (though without matching the subtlety of the master), but most disturbingly, his hero proves to be less sympathetic than Vance's harshest protagonists. Kerryl Ryson's family calamity is largely his own fault. There is not enough to admire in him, and his lapses into amorality leave a very bitter aftertaste."

The author notes that "my book The Thirteenth Majestral (or Dinosaur Park) was consciously written as 100% emulation of a Jack Vance novel, who, at the time, was a close friend of mine."

Raymond's Reviews said:

Footnotes

1989 American novels
1989 science fiction novels
Tor Books books